The 1882 Michigan gubernatorial election was held on November 7, 1882. Josiah W. Begole ran on a fusion ticket, representing both the Democratic and Greenback ticket. He defeated incumbent Republican David Jerome with 49.42% of the vote.

General election

Candidates
Major party candidates
Josiah W. Begole, Democratic, Greenback
David Jerome, Republican
Other candidates
Daniel P. Sagendorph, Prohibition
Waldo May, National
Charles C. Foote, Toleration

Results

References

1882
Michigan
Gubernatorial
November 1882 events